Qahtan Chathir  is an Iraqi football forward who played for Iraq in the 1996 Asian Cup. He also played for Al Talaba, Al Karkh, Al Ittihad, Al-Thaid, Al Sinaa.

Career

Playing career

Qahtan Chathir played for Al Talaba, Al Karkh, Al Ittihad, Al-Thaid and Al Sinaa until he retired in 2007.

Coaching career

After retiring in 2007, he was named head coach of Al-Sinaa and held the position until 2013.

Qahtan Chathir was appointed as Iraq U17 coach in 2014. He helped them to win the 2016 AFC U-16 Championship for the first time in Iraq's history.

Statistics

International goals
Scores and results list Iraq's goal tally first.

Managerial statistics

Honors

International
Iraq U-16
AFC U-16 Championship: 2016

References

External links
 

1973 births
1996 AFC Asian Cup players
2000 AFC Asian Cup players
Iraqi footballers
Iraqi expatriate footballers
Iraq international footballers
Living people
Al-Ittihad Kalba SC players
al-Talaba SC players
Al Dhaid SC players
al-Khor SC players
al-Karkh SC players
UAE First Division League players
UAE Pro League players
Al-Shorta SC managers
Al-Talaba SC managers
Al-Quwa Al-Jawiya managers
Expatriate footballers in the United Arab Emirates
Association football forwards
Iraqi football managers
Iraqi Premier League managers